is a Japanese voice actress from Nara Prefecture who is affiliated with Aoni Production. She began her career in 2020, and has played roles such as Nodoka Yagi in Selection Project and Shinju Inui in My Dress-Up Darling.

Career
Yōmiya was born in Nara Prefecture on March 26, 2000. In 2019, she participated in audition to play the lead role in the upcoming anime series Sakugan, where she became one of the seven finalist. Although she ultimately did not win the role, she became affiliated with talent agency Aoni Production the following year.

Yōmiya played her first main role in an anime series in 2021, voicing Nodoka Yagi in Selection Project. The following year, she played the roles of Shinju Inui in My Dress-Up Darling, Ginny Fin de Salvan in The Greatest Demon Lord Is Reborn as a Typical Nobody, and Sakurako Mikage in When Will Ayumu Make His Move?. In 2023, she will play the roles of Lainie Cyan in The Magical Revolution of the Reincarnated Princess and the Genius Young Lady and Anna Yamada in The Dangers in My Heart.

Filmography

Anime
2021
Selection Project, Nodoka Yagi

2022
My Dress-Up Darling, Shinju Inui
The Greatest Demon Lord Is Reborn as a Typical Nobody, Ginny Fin de Salvan
In the Heart of Kunoichi Tsubaki, Mokuren
When Will Ayumu Make His Move?, Sakurako Mikage

2023
The Magical Revolution of the Reincarnated Princess and the Genius Young Lady, Lainie Cyan
Giant Beasts of Ars, Kuumi
The Dangers in My Heart, Anna Yamada

Video games
2022
Goddess of Victory: Nikke as Alice
Azur Lane as Kala Ideas
2023
Atelier Ryza 3: Alchemist of the End & the Secret Key as Kala Ideas
Puella Magi Madoka Magica Side Story: Magia Record as Tsuyu Mizuna
Takt Op. Unmei wa Akaki Senritsu no Machi o as Opera [The Freeshooter]

References

External links
Agency profile 

2000 births
Aoni Production voice actors
Living people
Japanese voice actresses
Voice actresses from Nara Prefecture